= Polysoude =

Polysoude S.A.S.
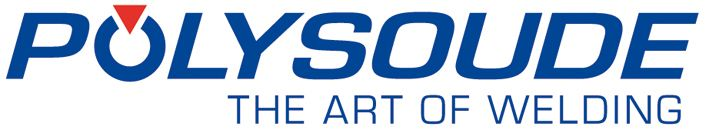
- Company type: Société par actions simplifiée
- Founded: 1961
- Headquarters: Nantes, France
- Key people: Hans-Peter Mariner (President)
- Products: Orbital Welding; Mechanised Welding; Cladding Solutions; Related Services
- Revenue: ▲€35 million (FY 2010)
- Number of employees: 150 (Nantes); 250 (Worldwide)
- Parent: Global Welding Technologies
- Subsidiaries: Astro Arc Polysoude Inc, USA; Polysoude Shanghai Co. Ltd, PRC; Polysoude Austria GmbH, AT, CZ, SK, SLO, HR; Polysoude Welding Technologies OOO, Russia, Belarus, Ukraine; Polysoude Italia S.r.l, Italy; Polysoude Switzerland AG, CH; Polysoude Deutschland GmbH, DE

Polysoude is a French welding company headquartered in Nantes. Its Holding Company, GWT Group (Global Welding Technologies), is located in Austria. Founded in 1961, Polysoude designs, manufactures and sells equipment and installations for orbital and mechanised welding as well as cladding. All the welding solutions for arc-welding are proposed. 85% of its turnover is generated abroad.

== History ==
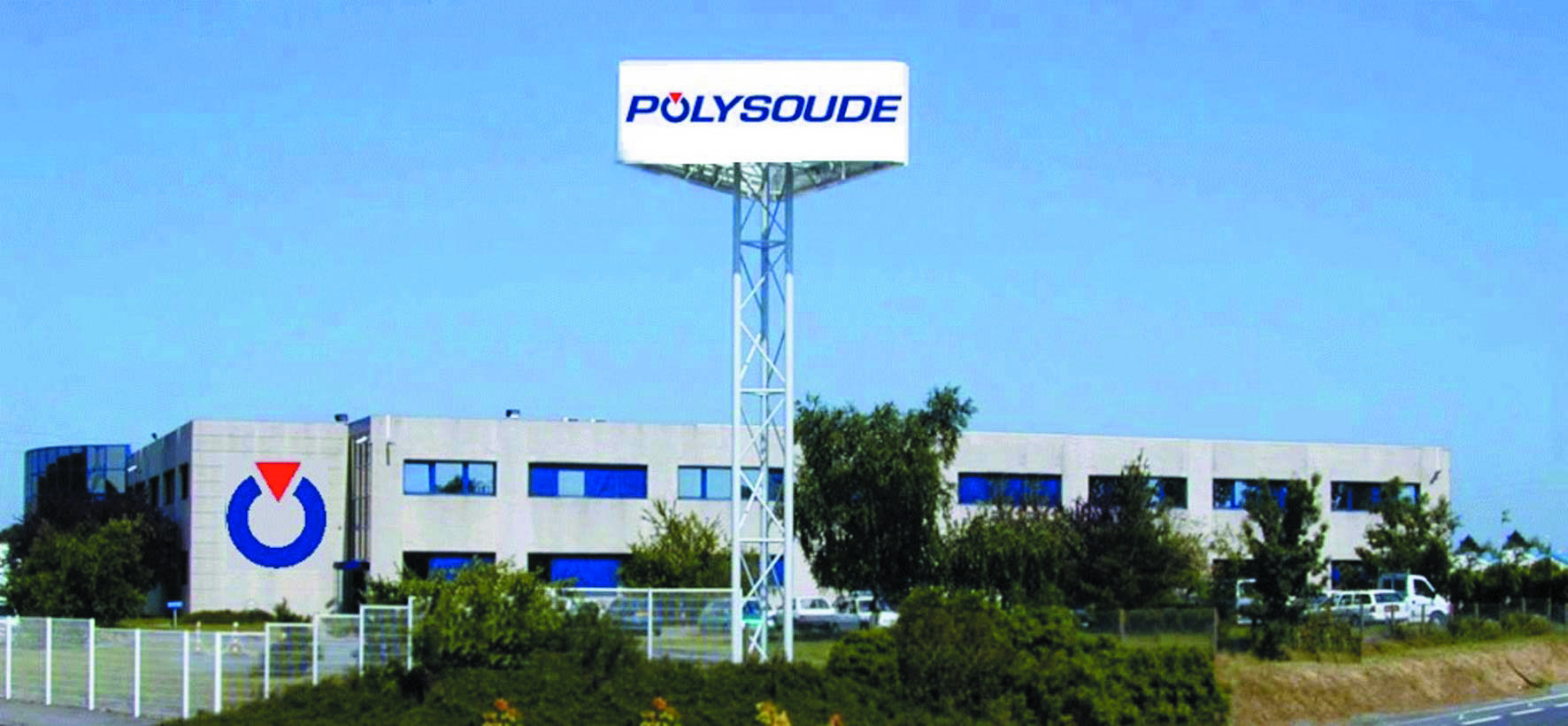
Polysoude's Nantes headquarters

Polysoude was created in 1961 focusing engineering and development on its first installations for orbital welding. The origin of its creation came from a specific request for the construction of power stations, with technical specifications requiring flawless and repetitive welds in order to guarantee a maximum level of security. Since then subsidiaries and offices now deal with the export market.

Direct Sales Network: Dates of the creation of subsidiaries and offices: ,

- 1993 Acquisition of ASTRO ARC POLYSOUDE Inc. In the United States.
- 2004 POLYSOUDE SHANGHAI Co. Ltd. China.
- 2005 POLYSOUDE AUSTRIA GmbH Austria.
- 2006 POLYSOUDE WT 000 Moscow, Russia.

- 2006 POLYSOUDE SUISSE S.A. Switzerland.
- 2007 POLYSOUDE ITALIA Spa Italy.
- 2009 POLYSOUDE Czech Republic.
- 2011 POLYSOUDE DEUTSCHLAND GmbH Germany.
- 2011 POLYSOUDE Brazil.

== Industries ==
Industries using orbital and mechanised welding:

- Construction of nuclear power plants
- Nuclear industry
- Boilermaking industry
- Construction of heat exchangers
- Petroleum industry (on/off shore)
- Aviation and Aerospace Industries
- Micro electronics (chip production)
- Food industry
- Pharmaceutical industry
- Chemical industry

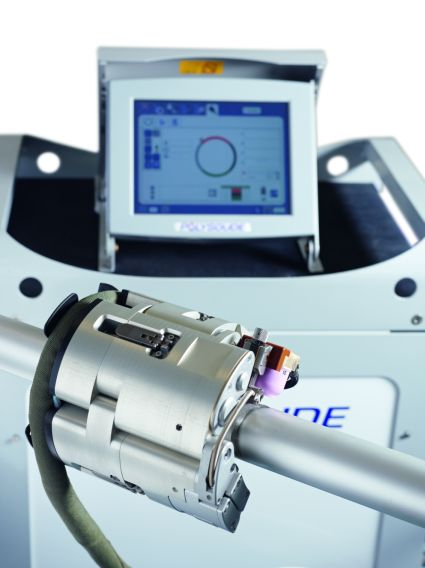
Orbital welding: A Polysoude welding generator head

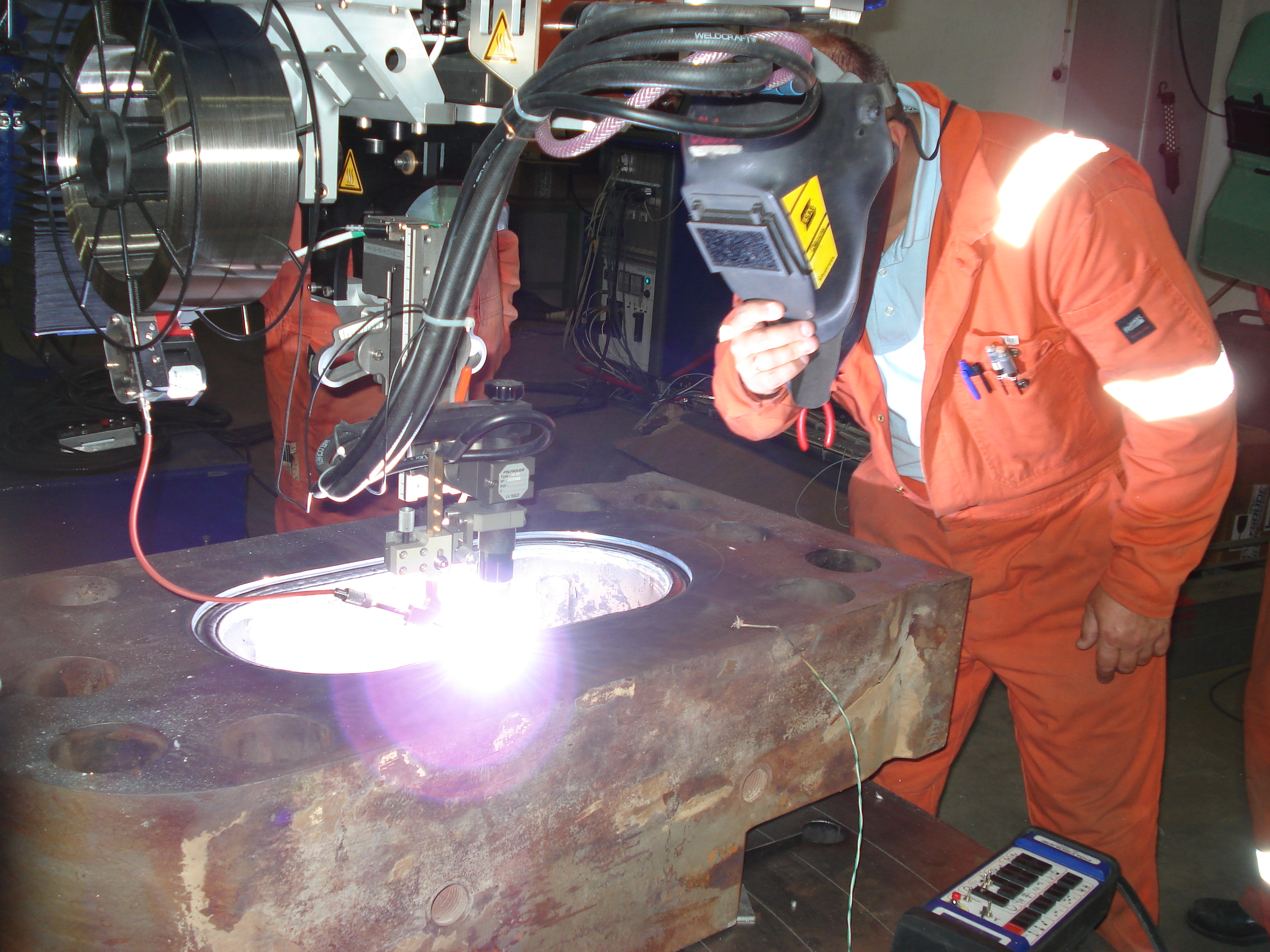
Cladding: Operation using TIG Hot Wire process.
